For the Plasma is a 2014 American independent science fiction film directed by Bingham Bryant and Kyle Molzan.

Synopsis
Two friends from days gone by, reconnect in an odd home by the sea. Although their occupation is to lookout for forest fires, Helen (Rosalie Lowe) has discovered her real job might be in analyzing the global financial market.  Tensions arise when her new assistant, Charlie (Anabelle LeMieux), has issues finding meaning in their endeavors.

Cast

Reception
On the review aggregator Rotten Tomatoes, the film holds an approval rating of 59%, based on 17 reviews, with an average rating of 5.4/10. Metacritic assigned the film a weighted average score of 51 out of 100, based on 10 critics, indicating "mixed or average reviews".

Richard Brody of The New Yorker praised the cinematography and direction, saying: "The movie’s visual prose, aided by simple but fanciful camera work, has an original, giddy spin; Bryant and Molzan’s smooth and floaty direction sublimates the rocky landscape into something disturbingly ethereal."

References

External links
 

2014 films
2010s English-language films